Cook is a lunar impact crater that lies in the western part of the Mare Fecunditatis, just to the southeast of the prominent crater Colombo. To the southwest is Monge.

The interior of this crater has been flooded with lava, leaving only a low rim projecting above the surface. This rim is not quite circular, and has a somewhat hexagonal appearance. The low wall is worn in a few places, particularly along the northeastern rim. There is a small crater called Cook A on the interior floor near the southeast rim.

Satellite craters
By convention these features are identified on lunar maps by placing the letter on the side of the crater midpoint that is closest to Cook.

References

 
 
 
 
 
 
 
 
 
 
 
 

Impact craters on the Moon